Vedanarayana Temple or Matsya Narayana Temple is a Hindu temple in Nagalapuram, Andhra Pradesh, India. It is a Vaishnava temple is dedicated to Lord Vishnu in the form of Matsya, the fish avatar, who is referred to as Matsya Narayana or Veda Narayana. This is one of the few temples in India where Lord Vishnu is depicted in Matsya avatar, the first incarnation of the Dashavatara, Lord Vishnu's 10 main incarnations.

Administration
The temple is being administered by Tirumala Tirupati Devasthanams.

Significance
The Temple is famous for Surya Pooja Utsavam, considered as an astronomical marvel. During this festival the sunrays will directly fall on the presiding deity Vedanarayaana in the Garbhagriha for three days of a year. The Sunrays travel a distance of 360 feet starting from Temple Tower(Goupuram) towards Garbha griha in the evening. On first day the rays will stop at foot of the Deity, second day on  Navel and third day on Crown.<ref
 name="suryapooja" />

Festivals
Surya Pooja Utsavam is one of the important festivals in the temple during which the rays of Sun directly fall on to the presiding deity in Garbhagriha which is facing west during evening before sunset.

See also
 List of Temples under Tirumala Tirupati Devasthanams(TTD)

References 

Hindu temples in Chittoor district
Tirumala Tirupati Devasthanams